The Latin American Series (Spanish: Serie Latinoamericana) was a baseball competition that annually gathers the champions of the professional winter baseball leagues (summer in the case of Curaçao) from the countries that are part of the Latin American Professional Baseball Association (ALBP). In the case of Mexico, the representative is the champion of Liga Invernal Veracruzana. Often, teams who qualify for this competition receive loan players from other teams in their respective leagues in order to improve their country's chance of winning.

History 

On February 10, 2012, the then president of the Colombian Professional Baseball League, together with executives of Liga Invernal Veracruzana, organized the Mexico-Colombia International Baseball Series between the champions of both competitions, where the Colombian champions, Toros de Sincelejo and Veracruz champions, Brujos de Los Tuxtlas, met in a 3-game series at Estadio Once de Noviembre in Cartagena, Colombia, with the Colombian outfit winning two games to one.

With the creation of the Latin American Professional Baseball Association in late-2012, the idea of creating a series that would integrate Latin American professional baseball teams materialised. As a result, the first Latin American Series was held from February 1 to 4, 2013 in Veracruz, Mexico. The first five editions of the series only contained teams from Colombia, Nicaragua, Mexico and Panama until the first expansion of the competition in 2018. This expansion included Curaçao, who had just created a professional league, followed by Argentina in 2019, with the intention of inviting Chile once a professional league is set up.

The rules of the competition match those of the World Baseball Classic and the teams wear their respective nation's national team uniform rather than their own for the duration of the series.

Leagues participating

Series

Championships by team

Championships by nation

All-time table

By team

By nation

Television rights

See also
Caribbean Series
Asia Series
European Cup
Baseball awards#Americas

References

External links 
 Official Site

 
Baseball in Central America
Baseball competitions in the Americas
Baseball in South America